The United League was an African-American social movement in Northern Mississippi established in 1978, during the height of Ku Klux Klan activity in America. The United League's president and founder, Alfred "Skip" Robinson, was moved to act against Klan activity and police brutality in the turbulent American South. Mr. Robinson was a brick mason by trade, but a charismatic preacher in practice. Through his leadership, the black communities of Northern Mississippi effectively tempered police beatings, organized citywide boycotts, prevented black land and property loss, urged armed defense among its members, and elected local blacks into political office.

The Leader
Alfred "Skip" Robinson was a formidable leader. Mr. Robinson was a brick mason by skilled trade; however, he was a skilled, organized, and charismatic civil rights leader. Robinson mobilized the black communities throughout northern Mississippi to act. Teaching armed defense and unified resistance tactics, Robinson was the quintessential leader for the oppressed people in Mississippi. Under his leadership, the residents fought against illegal land grabs by the state and local governments, boycotted white-owned businesses that did not hire blacks, and rallied against the brutality of the local police and Ku Klux Klan.

History
Robinson and his followers fought against the brutality of the local police and Ku Klux Klan activity during the late 1970s and early 1980s in Mississippi. Blacks across Mississippi experienced brutal beatings, black land theft, and destruction of personal property.

According to Southern Struggle (1978), the United League was "like the movement of the '60's, [the] demonstrations and boycotts raised demands for equality in hiring and education, an end to police brutality and murder of Blacks, and abolishment of the [Ku Klux] Klan…[However,] a significant difference is in the United Leagues' slogan of 'Jobs, Land, and Freedom.' The League has been organizing Afro-Americans to win back the  stolen from them by banks and agribusinesses in the last decade. To our knowledge, this is the first time since the 1930s that hundreds of Black people have united to fight for their land."

In Tupelo, Mississippi 
The members of the local community began marching in downtown Tupelo in 1979. During this time, the United League was active throughout the state. According to the Clarion Ledger (March 5, 1979, p. 3A), Robinson said, "the League would continue its boycott efforts in Lexington, Okolona, and Canton. Robinson said that charges of police brutality, which sparked the Tupelo protests, will mark Indianola and Grenada as sites for League activity."

The Tupelo activity was an extended battle between local black citizens and various white-owned and white-ran establishments, including local police. The blacks marched in unison. Robinson stated, "In employment, the city business have not hired enough blacks and the ratio of black and white school-teachers in the Tupelo high school is not in proportion to the number of black students. (The Commercial Appeal, Sunday, March 4, 1979).

In final analysis, according to the Southern Struggle (Nov-Dec, 1978), the "November 25 National March on Tupelo symbolized a new dawning for the Black liberation movement…The 3,000 marching in Tupelo showed that the cause of freedom is capturing the hearts and minds of people across the country. People came to Tupelo from the tiny backwater towns and from the huge, far-away cities…Just as the civil rights movement of the 60's began with a spark of resistance and grew to include millions in a march towards equality, in 1978, Tupelo is an inspiration for all who will join this movement – an inspiration that tells all working people that we can fight back and eventually win."

In Okolona, Mississippi 
In 1978, through marching and boycotts, the United League was active in Okolona, Mississippi. The "United League members said the demonstration was called to protest alleged racial discrimination and police brutality in the northern Mississippi community of about 3,000 persons…League leader Alfred "Skip" Robinson said the march would be one of several demonstrations planned. [Robinson stated,] "We're going to march and be in Okolona until every business goes out of business" (Clarion Ledger 3/19/1979).

During that same year, the members of the local community and the United League fired over one hundred rounds of bullets in a gunfight against the Ku Klux Klan. In the end, Alfred Robinson recounted, "When the shooting was over, six Klan were lying in the street and six were running. One of the six in the street was dead." Mr. Robinson stated that afterward neither party talked about the events that occurred on that day.

In Byhalia, Mississippi 
In 1978, in extensive and lasting social activism, the United League intervened when blacks were being killed every week. The United League and its supporters warned local police and the Klan that they would take "a life for a life"; and the killings ceased. In addition, during this time, the United League and its supporters led a citywide boycott and handed the local businesses a "list of demands, which included the hiring of blacks in stores and schools." As a result, many white-owned businesses suffered bankruptcy and were no longer viable without black consumerism.

In Ripley, Mississippi 
Robinson recounted, "In Ripley, at first, I couldn't get five people together. Now [less than a year later] I fill the funeral home at every meeting. That's 300 people." Alfred Robinson and other leaders gave the black community a sense of hope. Robinson, in particular, had preacher-like skills, and he knew the importance of the church within the black community.

Organizational Resources 
The United League used a combination of local resources. The black churches provided financial support. Robinson argued, "The only way you can defeat the Klan is by building a strong base in the community and letting them know you will fight back."

In Ripley, one of the first stops of the United League was a beauticians' school owned by a local community activist, Mrs. Hazel Foster Christmas. These types of facilities provided communication networks within a community and were a vital component of the United League.

The Women Leaders 
The United League recognized the leadership capabilities and strength in their female membership. George Williams, another League leader, stated, "[Women] are the ones who carry on the task of building the organization, planning protests and boycotts, and above all convincing people that they can stand ... against social violence."

Organizational Characteristics 
The United League employed boycotts, armed defense, and organized protest activities in order to effect change in northern Mississippi. United League supporters like L.B. Groover actively engaged in local political campaigns. In combination, these social resources united monies, labor, volunteerism, and activism within the Mississippi community.

Additionally, through the guidance of Robinson, the United League and its members in northern Mississippi organized community meetings and created a coalition of resources in the struggle for human and civil rights. Robinson claimed that the United League members "[went] house to house, street by street, through the black community" and encouraged community activist workshops.

The Current Status of the Organization 
The United League is no longer an active organization.

References

Marx, Andrew and Tom Tuthill. "Resisting the Klan: Mississippi Organizes." Southern Exposure. 8.2 (Summer 1980): 73-76. Print.
Hooded Americanism: The History of the Ku Klux Klan, by David Mark Chalmers
The Fiery Cross: The Ku Klux Klan in America by Wyn Craig Wade
Rationing Justice: Poverty Lawyers and Poor People in the Deep South by Kris Shepard
Backfire: How the Ku Klux Klan Helped the Civil Rights Movement by David Mark Chalmers
Grand expectations: the United States, 1945–1974 by James T. Patterson 
Black life in Mississippi: Essays on Political, Social, and Cultural Studies by Julius Eric Thompson 
Have We Overcome?: Race Relations Since Brown, 1954–1979 by Michael V. Namorato 
We Will Shoot Back: Armed Resistance in the Mississippi Freedom Movement by Akinyele Umoja

Additional Printed Resources

Political Crime in the United States: Analyzing Crime By and Against Government   by Julian B. Roebuck, Stanley C. Weeber
Southern Exposure, Volumes 5-6 by Institute for Southern Studies
Southern Exposure, Volume 8 by Institute for Southern Studies
Social reform and reaction in America: an annotated bibliography by ABC-Clio Information Services
Dollars & Sense, Issues 43-62
Christianity & Crises, Volume 42
U.S. Commission on Civil Rights fiscal year 1981 authorization (Hearing) by United States Congress. Senate. Committee on the Judiciary. Subcommittee on the Constitution.
U.S. News & World Report, Volume 86
The Federal Reporter, Volume 569

Articles on the United League
"We Will Shoot Back: The Natchez Model and Paramilitary Organization in the Mississippi Freedom Movement" by Akinyele Omowale Umoja / Georgia State University. Journal of Black Studies, Vol. 32, No. 3, 271-294 (2002). 

Abstract:

"Between 1965 and 1979, economic boycotts were a principal form of insurgency for Black activists in Mississippi. After 1964, in several communities, the boycott of White-owned commerce became the primary tactic utilized by human rights forces to disrupt the system of segregation. These boycotts relied upon paramilitary organization to protect the activities and leadership of the Mississippi freedom movement and the Black community in general and to sanction anyone in the Black community who wished to violate the boycott. This paradigm of economic boycotts supported by paramilitary organization was first utilized in 1965 in Natchez. Natchez is a commercial center in southwest Mississippi. The combination of economic boycott with armed resistance posed an effective coercive campaign to pressure the local White power structure for concessions demanded by the movement. The insurgent model of Natchez was replicated throughout the state, particularly in Black communities of southwest Mississippi."

"Beware of the Frustrated...": The Fantasy and Reality of African American Violent Revolt" by Donn C. Worgs / Towson University. Journal of Black Studies, Sep 2006; vol. 37: pp. 20 – 45. 

Abstract:

"Throughout African Americans' struggle for liberation, there have been incidents of their engaging in violent revolt—from slave revolts to the urban riots of the 21st century. Images and depictions of violent revolt have also been a recurring element in African American artistic productions—including literature, music, and film. An analysis of these "fantasies" of violent revolt provides insight into how African Americans understand violent revolt, and under what conditions such actions are justified. The analysis reveals that violent revolt is understood by many as both instrumental (a means to a desired end—usually freedom) and cathartic. Furthermore, there are four recurring themes within these fantasies. These include a justification for violence, the need to fight to gain the "respect" of the oppressor, the rage of the oppressed along with their yearning for retribution, and the humanizing or transformative effect of participating in a violent revolt against an oppressor."

"`We Are Taking Up Where the Movement of the 1960s Left Off': The Proliferation and Power of African American Protest during the 1970s" by Stephen Tuck. Journal of Contemporary History, Oct 2008; vol. 43: pp. 637 – 654. 

Introductory Paragraph:

"The small city of Tupelo stands in the middle of former sharecropping country in northern Mississippi. By the mid-twentieth century the 'All-American' city had become a relatively prosperous mercantile centre, known to some as the birthplace of Elvis Presley. City fathers boasted of settled race relations. Then the summer came, and the civil rights protests began. A charismatic leader, Alfred 'Skip' Robinson, inspired hymn-singing mass meetings in local churches. Children joined their mothers on the picket lines, protesting poor treatment in downtown shops. African American veterans led marches. Ku Klux Klan members countermarched. City police beat up one young black man. A local attorney filed suit. It was hard to know who was more worried by the turn of events: the traditional African American leadership or the white city fathers. To 'heal the sore' the city set up a biracial committee. To keep up the pressure, the movement continued a 'silent' boycott. The committee agreed to improve African American voter registration, investigate charges of police brutality, and hire black workers at downtown stores."

"Mississippi Organizes: Resisting the Klan" by A Marx and T Tuthill. Southern Exposure  Volume:8  Issue:2  Dated:(Summer 1980)  Pages:25-28. 

Abstract:

"Robinson, who serves as president of the organization he founded, establishes local chapters of the United League upon request by local citizens. In a community requesting help, Robinson holds workshop meetings in each black neighborhood, where problems and needs are identified and strategies planned for addressing them. An ongoing community organization continues to meet after Robinson leaves to guide blacks of the community in resolving problems and meeting needs. Where the Klan is active and discrimination is practiced, the United League advocates demonstrations, business boycotts, and armed self-defense. The policy of armed self-defense has been particularly effective in countering Klan violence against blacks. In those communities where blacks have met Klan force with armed self-defense, the Klan has backed down."

Jet May 25, 1978 

Organizations based in Mississippi